Uncoupled is an American romantic comedy television series created and written by Darren Star and Jeffrey Richman that premiered on Netflix on July 29, 2022. 

The series was featured in the Netflix "Top 10" list at number six for one week. In January 2023, it was announced the show would not be renewed for a second season. In February 2023, Showtime (owned by Paramount) picked up the series for a second season.

Synopsis 
The series stars Neil Patrick Harris as a newly single gay Manhattanite navigating the dating scene for the first time in 17 years after getting abruptly dumped by his long-term partner. As he adjusts to being single in his late 40s, he discovers that the gay dating environment has changed while he was in a relationship, and he rapidly realizes that in order to not be single forever, he must take action.

Cast and characters

Main
 Neil Patrick Harris as Michael Lawson, a New York City real estate agent 
 Tuc Watkins as Colin McKenna, Michael's ex of 17 years
 Tisha Campbell as Suzanne Prentiss, Michael's business partner
 Marcia Gay Harden as Claire Lewis, a wealthy woman who was recently left by her husband and becomes a client of Michael
 Emerson Brooks as Billy Burns, a TV weatherman and one of Michael's best friends
 Brooks Ashmanskas as Stanley James, an art dealer and one of Michael's best friends

Recurring
 André De Shields as Jack, an older man who is Michael's down the hall neighbor at 44 Gramercy Park
 Colin Hanlon as Jonathan #1, engaged to Jonathan #2 and one of Michael's best friends 
 Jai Rodriguez as Jonathan #2, engaged to Jonathan #1 and one of Michael's best friends 
 Nic Rouleau as Tyler Hawkins, a real estate broker and rival to Michael and Suzanne
 Jasai Chase Owens as Kai Prentiss, Suzanne's son
 Stephanie Faracy as Lisa Lawson, Michael's mother
 Byron Jennings as Ben Lawson, Michael's father

Guest
 Gilles Marini as Paolo, an Italian businessman who Michael has a one-night stand with
 Peter Porte as Josh Gibson, a dermatologist who Michael briefly dates
 David Burtka as Jerry, Billy's co-worker and Stanley's love interest (Burtka and Neil Patrick Harris are married in real life.)
 Dan Amboyer as Luke, a third grade teacher who is Michael's love interest
 David Pittu as Dennis, Colin and Michael's marriage counsellor
 Gonzalo Aburto de la Fuente as Wyatt, Billy's love interest
 Bruce Altman as Henry, Claire's ex-husband
 David A. Gregory as Corey, a realtor Michael re-connects with on a ski trip
 Tamala Jones as Mia, Suzanne's friend

Episodes

Reception

Critical response
On review aggregator website Rotten Tomatoes, the series holds an 73% approval rating based on 49 critic reviews, with an average rating of 6.6/10. The website's critics consensus reads, "While Uncoupled struggles to integrate the comedic thrills of modern dating with its more serious concerns, the uneasy mixture makes for a surprisingly mature evolution of the Darren Star formula." On Metacritic, it has a score of 64 out of 100, based on 25 critics, indicating "generally favorable reviews". The Washington Post and The Guardian found the show "flat and lifeless", while the Los Angeles Times described it as "a sweet, grown-up entertainment".

Accolades

See also
 LGBT culture in New York City

References

External links
 
 

2020s American LGBT-related comedy television series
2020s American romantic comedy television series
2020s American sex comedy television series
2022 American television series debuts
American television series revived after cancellation
Gay-related television shows
English-language Netflix original programming
Television series created by Darren Star
Television shows set in New York City
Showtime (TV network) original programming